Our Time is a 2018 Mexican drama film directed by Carlos Reygadas. It was selected to be screened in the main competition section of the 75th Venice International Film Festival.

Cast
 Carlos Reygadas
 Natalia López
 Phil Burgers
 Rut Reygadas
 Eleazar Reygadas

References

External links
 

2018 films
2018 drama films
Mexican drama films
2010s Spanish-language films
Films directed by Carlos Reygadas
2010s Mexican films